Ugo Capocchini (1 February 1901 – 2 March 1980) was an Italian artist. He won many awards throughout his career, and became a Professor at the Accademia Di Belle Arti in Florence in the 1960s. In his birthplace, Barberino Val d'Elsa, a square and a community hall have been named after him.

Early life
Ugo Capocchini moved from Barberino Val d'Elsa to Florence where he attended Liceo Artistico and later the Accademia di Belle Arti. He met Pietro Annigoni at the school of the Circolo Degli Artisti.

Career 
In 1928, he won the Panerai Award for his work "Nudo" at the Gallery of Modern Art of Firenze (Florence).

In the 1930s and 1940s, he attended with many contemporary artists and writers the Caffè Giubbe Rosse.

In 1940, he was invited to do a solo exhibition in the 1950 Venice Biennale.

Capocchini had his first solo exhibition in 1950 in the Strozzina at Palazzo Strozzi in Florence, and a second solo exhibition in 1961 at Gallery Vantaggio in Rome.  The third solo exhibition in 1968 was held at Palazzo Strozzi in Florence.

In 1951, he received the Premio Michetti in Francavilla a Mare.

In 1954, he received the Premio Marzotto  in Valdagno.

In 1955, he received the Fiorino d'Oro of Firenze.

In the 1960s, he was Professor at Accademia di Belle Arti of Florence.

In 2001, on the centenary of his birth, Barberino Val d'Elsa, his birthplace, dedicated a retrospective on his art.

Barberino Val d'Elsa also has dedicated a square and a community hall to him.

Painting bibliography
His works appeared in:

References

20th-century Italian painters
20th-century Italian male artists
Italian male painters
Painters from Florence
1980 deaths
1901 births
People from Barberino Val d'Elsa